In the Presence of the Enemy is a crime novel by Elizabeth George.

References 

1996 American novels
American mystery novels
Bantam Books books